Tullebølle is a town in south Denmark, located in Langeland Municipality on the island of Langeland in Region of Southern Denmark. Tullebølle has a population of 756 (1 January 2022).

References

Cities and towns in the Region of Southern Denmark
Langeland Municipality